Diamond Horseshoe (also billed as Billy Rose's Diamond Horseshoe) is a 1945 Technicolor musical film starring Betty Grable and Dick Haymes, directed by George Seaton, and released by 20th Century Fox. It was filmed in Billy Rose's Diamond Horseshoe, a nightclub located in the basement of the Paramount Hotel. The film's score is by Harry Warren and Mack Gordon.

Background
Diamond Horseshoe is a remake of two previous films derived from the same story, The Barker  (1928) and Hoop-La (1933). Grable played the role previously played by Dorothy Mackaill in The Barker and Clara Bow in Hoop-La. All are based on the 1928 play The Barker by Kenyon Nicholson.

Plot

Joe Davis Sr. performs in a big nightclub called Billy Rose's Diamond Horseshoe in the Paramount Hotel in Manhattan. He is visited by his son Joe Jr. who is a medical student. Joe Jr. tells his father that he wants to be in show business, much to his father's disapproval. Nevertheless, Joe Sr. gives his son a job at his club where Joe Jr. then becomes smitten with Bonnie Collins, the club's headlining act. 

Joe Sr. is spending too much time worrying about his son that he starts to neglect his own girlfriend Claire. Claire promises to give Bonnie a mink coat if she pretends to like and go out with Joe Jr., so that Joe Sr. will pay more attention to her. Things take a complicated turn when Bonnie actually does fall in love with Joe Jr. and they get married, again much to his father's disapproval.

Cast

Betty Grable as Bonnie Collins
Dick Haymes as Joe Davis Jr.
William Gaxton as Joe Davis Sr.
Beatrice Kay as Claire Williams
Phil Silvers as Blinkie Miller
Margaret Dumont as Mrs. Standish
Carmen Cavallaro as Himself
Eddie Acuff as Clarinet Player
Sam Ash (actor) as Extra at Footlight Club
Charles Coleman as Majordomo
 Hal K. Dawson as Sam Carter
 Cathy Downs as Miss Cream Puff
 Dick Elliott as Footlight Club Waiter
 Franklyn Farnum as Extra at Nightclub Table
 Jean Fenwick as Lady Be-Good
 Bess Flowers as Duchess of Duke
 Gladys Gale as Chorine
 Edward Gargan as Grogan, stage hand
 Mack Gray as Mack, the waiter
 Reed Hadley as Intern
 Bud Jamison as Footlight Club patron
 Phyllis Kennedy as Frank's nightclub girlfriend
 Mildred Kornman as Chorine
 Eddie Laughton as Eddie
 Barbara Lawrence as Blonde in nightclub
 Julie London as Chorine
 George Melford as Pop, stage doorman
 Eve Miller as Chorine
 Frank Mills as Waiter
 Lee Phelps as Bartender at the Diamond Horseshoe
 Bob Reeves as Doorman at Club 21
 Phillips Tead as Waiter with cart
 Ray Teal as Tough Customer at Footlight Club

Reception
The film was very successful when it was released, but because of its high cost struggled to make a profit. Grable's other picture that year The Dolly Sisters was one of Fox's highest-grossing films of 1945.

References

External links

1945 films
1945 musical films
20th Century Fox films
American musical films
Remakes of American films
Sound film remakes of silent films
1945 directorial debut films
Films produced by William Perlberg
1940s English-language films
1940s American films
Films set in nightclubs